Géza Mészöly (born 25 February 1967) is a Hungarian former professional football player and current manager of Nemzeti Bajnokság II club, Győri ETO FC.

Coaching career
As a manager, Mészöly won two silver medals in the Hungarian Championship with Újpest FC in 2004 and 2006.

Győr
On 22 June 2018, he was appointed the manager of Nemzeti Bajnokság II club, Győri ETO FC.

Personal life
His father was Kálmán Mészöly, former football player and coach of the Hungary national team.

Honours
Manager of the Year in Hungary: 2004

References

External links
 

1967 births
Living people
Association football defenders
Hungarian footballers
Hungary international footballers
Ligue 1 players
K League 1 players
Cypriot First Division players
Vasas SC players
Pohang Steelers players
Le Havre AC players
Lille OSC players
AEL Limassol players
Maccabi Ironi Ashdod F.C. players
FC Tatabánya players
Hungarian football managers
Nemzeti Bajnokság I managers
Újpest FC managers
Vasas SC managers
Szombathelyi Haladás football managers
Hungarian expatriate footballers
Hungarian expatriate sportspeople in South Korea
Expatriate footballers in South Korea
Hungarian expatriate sportspeople in France
Expatriate footballers in France
Hungarian expatriate sportspeople in Cyprus
Expatriate footballers in Cyprus
Hungarian expatriate sportspeople in Israel
Expatriate footballers in Israel